Woodstock High School is a high school located in Woodstock, New Brunswick, Canada. Woodstock High receives new students primarily from Townsview School and Meduxnekeag Consolidated School, also in Woodstock.

Hockey teams
Woodstock High's Lady Thunder Hockey team was awarded the New Brunswick Human Rights Award, and the Grace Under Pressure Award in 2009.

Woodstock High's Varsity Men's Hockey teams have won multiple provincial championships and awards.

Fine arts
The WHS Choir is a Provincial Championship choir and National Championship finalist. The Improv team is a former Provincial Champion and National Championship finalist.

References

External links
Woodstock High School
Woodstock High School Class of 1978 Official Site

Educational institutions established in 1977
High schools in New Brunswick
Woodstock, New Brunswick
1977 establishments in New Brunswick
Schools in Carleton County, New Brunswick